Argyrotaenia dichotoma is a species of moth of the family Tortricidae. It is found in Mexico in the states of Guerrero and Chiapas and in Guatemala.

The wingspan is about 22 mm. The forewings are pale straw-ochreous, suffused  and striated with reddish brown. The hindwings are shining whitish.

References

Moths described in 1914
dichotoma
Moths of North America